The Liberty Hill Independent is the local weekly newspaper published in Liberty Hill, Texas. It was founded October 1987, by Jim Linzy. It serves as the print division of Free State Media Group. The owner and editor is Shelly Wilkison. The Independent is a member of the Texas Press association.

See also
 Liberty Hill Independent's online division

References

Weekly newspapers published in the United States